Goat tying is a rodeo event in which the participant rides to a tethered goat, dismounts, catches, throws, and ties any three of its legs together. The goat must stay tied for six seconds after the contestant has backed away from the animal. If the goat becomes untied before six seconds have passed, the rider receives no score.  A participant may be disqualified for undue roughness while handling the goat, touching the goat after the tie, or after signaling completion of the tie, or the contestant's horse coming in contact with the goat or tether while the contestant has control of the horse.

The event is not seen in professional rodeo, but is a common event seen at youth, high school rodeo and intercollegiate rodeo levels.  In most cases, it is considered a women's event.

Event
The object is to race to the end of the rodeo arena to a goat staked out on a  rope, catch the goat, throw it to the ground and tie three of its feet together. The distance from the starting line to the stake varies, but is usually 100 feet or so. Contestants dismount their horse while it is running, run to the staked-out goat, which must be taken to the ground and laid on its side in order to tie three of its legs together.  The rope used is a nylon or cotton rope with an approximate length of four feet, called a "goat string."  There are two main types of strings, rope and braided. Rope strings come in 2 and 3 ply, meaning 2 or 3 strands of rope are twisted to create the goat tying string, this type is generally less flexible and most common among contestants. The braided string is a flimsy type, though more flexible, resembling a thick braided shoelace. Beeswax or rosin is used to preserve the longevity of the string and help the tie hold longer.  When the goat is tied, contestants signal the end of their run by throwing their hands up and getting off the goat to indicate the completion of the run. The contestant with the fastest time wins.

There are penalties that may be added to the contestant's run at the judge’s discretion, including disqualification if the goat comes untied during the 6-second tie period, and a 10-second penalty (depending on the rodeo sanctioning organization) added to a time if the horse crosses the staked rope of the goat or causes the goat to become loose.  If the contestant touches the goat or string after indicating that they are finished, they will receive a no time. Also, after the contestant is finished tying, they must move at least three feet away from the goat.

Goat tying is typically done by girls in high school and college rodeos, and by both boys and girls at junior or youth rodeos.  Depending on the level of competition, a winning time could be in the range of seven to nine seconds.

See also
Rodeo
Barrel racing
Breakaway roping
Dally Ribbon Roping
Steer riding
Mutton busting

References

External links
National Little Britches Rodeo Goat Tying. 
http://www.nhsra.com/

Rodeo events
Mounted games
Goats